Lake Holm is a census-designated place (CDP) in King County, Washington, United States. The population was 3,221 at the 2010 census.

Geography 
Lake Holm is located in southwestern King County at  (47.306388, -122.129911). It is bordered to the west by the city of Auburn and to the north by the Lake Morton-Berrydale CDP. The southern border of the Lake Holm CDP follows the Green River, and the northern border follows Big Soos Creek and Covington Creek, tributaries of the Green.

References

Census-designated places in King County, Washington